WSOR may refer to:

 Wisconsin and Southern Railroad
 WSOR (FM), a radio station (90.9 FM) licensed to Naples, Florida, United States